Clanculus albugo is a species of sea snail, a marine gastropod mollusk in the family Trochidae, the top snails.

Description
The small, conoidal shell has a tumid conical base. It is bluntly bicarinate and umbilicate with a resinous luster. Its sculpture shows very many irregular oblique faint lines of growth, with a few remote rounded spirals, which are very weak above, stronger on the base, and of which two at the periphery form a feeble double carina. The color of the shell is: a pale transparent resinous brown, flecked below the sutures and, at the periphery with alternate spots of white and crimson.  The latter color runs in minute zigzag streaks down the shell. There are also, both above and on the base, a few delicate spirals of alternate crimson and white specks. The spire is rather low, with curved profile lines and a blunt round apex. The five whorls are rounded and sloping above, flat at the periphery, and tumid on the base. The suture is linear and very slightly depressed. The round aperture is rather large. The outer lip is thin. The inner lip is thin, hollowed out backwards, and bending somewhat across the umbilicus. The umbilicus is a broad shallow funnel, contracting to a small deep hole.

Distribution
This marine species is endemic to Australia and occurs off New South Wales.

References

 Watson, R.B. 1880. Mollusca of "H.M.S. Challenger" expedition. Part V. Families Solenoconchia, Trochidae, Heterophrosynidae, Litorinidae, Cerithiidae. Journal of the Linnean Society of London, Zoology 15: 87-126
 Whitelegge, T. 1889. List of the Marine and Freshwater Invertebrate Fauna of Port Jackson and the Neighbourhood. Journal and Proceedings of the Royal Society of New South Wales 23: 1-161
 Hedley, C. 1918. A checklist of the marine fauna of New South Wales. Part 1. Journal and Proceedings of the Royal Society of New South Wales 51: M1-M120
 Thornley, G. 1951. Marine shell collecting on the north coast of New South Wales. Proceedings of the Royal Zoological Society of New South Wales 1949-1950: 44-52 
 Garrard, T.A. 1961. Mollusca collected by M. V. "Challenger" off the east coast of Australia. Journal of the Malacological Society of Australia 5: 3-38
 Iredale, T. & McMichael, D.F. 1962. A reference list of the marine Mollusca of New South Wales. Memoirs of the Australian Museum 11: 1-109

External links
 To Biodiversity Heritage Library (1 publication)
 To World Register of Marine Species

albugo
Gastropods of Australia
Gastropods described in 1880